The Lyon Air Museum is an aerospace museum located on the west side of the John Wayne Airport in Santa Ana, California, United States. The museum features military aircraft, rare automobiles, military vehicles and motorcycles, and related memorabilia, with an emphasis on World War II.

Aircraft 
Eight airworthy condition aircraft are on display:

 Boeing B-17 Flying Fortress
 Cessna O-1E Bird Dog
 Douglas DC-3
 Douglas C-47 Skytrain
 North American B-25 Mitchell
 Douglas A-26 Invader
 North American SNJ-6 Texan, added in summer of 2013
 Boeing Stearman PT13D

Special summer car exhibits 
Each year Lyon Air Museum hosts its annual Summer Car Exhibit that features a number of cars that are based on a specific theme.

See also
List of aviation museums

References

External links

 

Museums in Orange County, California
Aerospace museums in California
John Wayne Airport